Uromacer frenatus is a species of snake in the family Colubridae. The species is endemic to Hispaniola in the West Indies.

Geographic range
U. frenatus is found in Haiti and the Dominican Republic.

Habitat

Reproduction
U. frenatus is oviparous.

Subspecies
Four subspecies are recognized as being valid, including the nominotypical subspecies.
Uromacer frenatus chlorauges 
Uromacer frenatus dorsalis 
Uromacer frenatus frenatus 
Uromacer frenatus wetmorei 

Nota bene: A trinomial authority in parentheses indicates that the subspecies was originally described in a genus other than Uromacer.

Etymology
The subspecific name, wetmorei, is in honor of American ornithologist Alexander Wetmore.

References

Further reading
Boulenger GA (1894). Catalogue of the Snakes in the British Museum (Natural History). Volume II., Containing the Conclusion of the Colubridæ Aglyphæ. London: Trustees of the British Museum (Natural History). (Taylor and Francis, printers). xi + 382 pp. + Plates I-XX. (Uromacer frenatus, p. 116).
Günther A (1865). "Fourth Account of new Species of Snakes in the Collection of the British Museum". Annals and Magazine of Natural History, Third Series 15: 89–98. (Ahætulla frenata, new species, pp. 94–95 + Plate II, figure B).
Schwartz A, Henderson RW (1991). Amphibians and Reptiles of the West Indies: Descriptions, Distributions, and Natural History. Gainesville: University of Florida Press. 720 pp. . (Uromacer frenatus, p. 663).
Schwartz A, Thomas R (1975). A Check-list of West Indian Amphibians and Reptiles. Carnegie Museum of Natural History Special Publication No. 1. Pittsburgh, Pennsylvania: Carnegie Museum of Natural History. 216 pp. (Uromacer dorsalis, p. 201, U. frenatus, p. 202).

Reptiles described in 1865
Reptiles of Haiti
Reptiles of the Dominican Republic
Endemic fauna of Hispaniola
Taxa named by Albert Günther